Carduus pycnocephalus, with common names including Italian thistle, Italian plumeless thistle, and Plymouth thistle, is a species of thistle. It is native to: the Mediterranean region in southern Europe, North Africa, and Western Asia; East Europe and the Caucasus; and the Indian Subcontinent.

The plant has become an introduced species in other regions, and on other continents, often becoming a noxious weed or invasive species.

Description

The multiple stems are winged with spines.

Cauline leaves are tomentose on the underside and contain spines on the lobe tips.

Flower heads are 2-5 per cluster, densely matted with cobwebby hairs at the base of the phyllaries and spiny towards the tips. Corollas are pink to purple, approx. .4-.6 in (1-1.4 cm) long, and the fruits are brown to gold, with a bristly, minutely barbed pappus.

Noxious weed
 
Carduus pycnocephalus has become a noxious weed in Australia, New Zealand, Macaronesia, South Africa, the Arabian Peninsula, South America, Hawaii, and North America, especially in much of California. It is a C-listed weed by the California Department of Agriculture and a Moderate Invasive Plant rating by the California Invasive Plant Council.  It favors grasslands, woodlands, and chaparral vegetation types, but is especially prevalent in oak woodlands in and around the Central Valley. It is found in disturbed areas, often with basaltic soils, fertile soils, or soils with a relatively high pH (> 6.5).

Impacts
Italian thistle can grow densely, crowding out other vegetation with dense rosette 'colonies' in the winter, thereby preventing establishment of native plants. Its spiny leaves, stems, and phyllaries prevent animals from grazing on it and nearby forage. Its tendency to grow under the canopy of oaks increases the risk of wildfire damage to the trees, as fire can more easily spread to the canopy.

Control
Mechanical
Mechanical methods can be effective but must be done before the plant sets seed.

Biological
Biological control agents have limited success with Carduus pycnocephalus. Insects that tested host-specific by the California Dept. of Agriculture and caused significant damage to the reproductive structures of the Italian thistle have not been utilized, due to concerns about possible predation of California's native thistle species. Puccinia cardui-pycnocephali is a species of rust (fungus) apparently exclusive to Carduus pycnocephalus. Other rust species have been found on Italian thistle as well.

Grazing by sheep or goats (not cattle) in Australia has showed promise as well.
 
Chemical
Chemical control can be achieved with a variety of products including: Clopyralid, glyphosate, Diquat, Picloram, and 2, 4-D ester. However, caution must be exercised when using these products, and their use is not always appropriate, especially near water surfaces and other sensitive natural habitats. Check with local,  regional, and national regulations directing use.

References

External links

USDA Plants Profile: Carduus pycnocephalus  (Italian plumeless thistle)
Jepson Manual Treatment — Carduus pycnocephalus
Carduus pycnocephalus — CalPhoto gallery

pycnocephalus
Flora of North Africa
Flora of Western Asia
Flora of Europe
Flora of Afghanistan
Flora of Egypt
Flora of Greece
Flora of the Indian subcontinent
Flora of Iran
Flora of Iraq
Flora of Israel
Flora of Italy
Flora of Jordan
Flora of Libya
Flora of Morocco
Flora of Palestine (region)
Flora of Spain
Flora of Switzerland
Flora of Ukraine